A jam sandwich is usually composed of two slices of bread with jam (or jelly) in the middle. It is normally consumed at lunchtime or as a snack.  In Scotland, they are also known as pieces and jam, or jeely pieces.

If another spread is added, particularly peanut butter, it becomes a variation of the Peanut Butter and Jelly (PB&J) sandwich.

Origin 
Jam sandwiches are thought to have originated at around the 19th century in the United Kingdom.  The jam sandwich was an affordable food. One plausible reason for this was that the ingredients that the jam sandwiches were made from cost little to manufacture and due to taxes being lifted on sugar in 1880, it became widely available as a cheap foodstuff.

Ingredients 
Any type of jam
Bread or brown bread (i.e., white or wholemeal)

In popular culture 
The popular Scottish folk song The Jeely Piece Song, which appeared in the 1960s, humorously describes the effect of new social housing policies on the eating habits of Scottish youngsters. The lyrics were written by Adam McNaughton, and it was sung to the tune of Does Your Chewing Gum Lose Its Flavour (On the Bedpost Overnight?). It was performed by Matt McGinn and many others.

The musical group Jethro Tull referenced a jam sandwich in their 1971 song "Up the 'Pool." 'The 'Pool' is short for Blackpool, Lancashire, in the north of England, and singer Ian Anderson adopts a Lancashire inflection and colloquialisms: "I'm going up the 'Pool/ from down the smoke [referring to London 
In the south of England, renowned for its air pollution prior to smokeless zoning laws] below/ to taste me mum's jam sarnies/ and see our Auntie Flo."

In Charles Schulz's Peanuts comic, Linus is fond of what he calls "jelly-bread sandwiches".

See also
 List of sandwiches
 Peanut butter and jelly sandwich

References 

Sandwiches